Karlebotn is a village in Nesseby Municipality in Troms og Finnmark county, Norway. The statistical area of Karlebotn, which also includes the peripheral parts of the village, as well as the surrounding countryside, has a population of 93.

Media gallery

References

Nesseby
Villages in Finnmark
Populated places of Arctic Norway